La Cañada Flintridge, commonly known as "La Cañada" (Spanish for "The Canyon"), is a city in the foothills of the  Verdugo Mountains in Los Angeles County, California. Located in the Crescenta Valley, in the western edge of Southern California's San Gabriel Valley, it is the location of NASA's Jet Propulsion Laboratory. Before the city's incorporation on November 30, 1976, it consisted of two distinct communities, "La Cañada" and "Flintridge".

History

Reference to the entire city is often shortened to just "La Cañada" or seldom to just "Flintridge". The full city name specifically does not have a hyphen in it, to illustrate unity between the two communities that became one.

La Cañada 
La Cañada comes from the Spanish word , meaning 'canyon', 'gorge', or 'ravine'.

In December 1933 and January 1934, the La Cañada Valley was severely flooded in the Crescenta Valley flood (1933 and 1934).

Flintridge 
Flintridge was named after its developer, United States Senator Frank P. Flint.

Flintridge comprises the southern part of the city, covering the northern flank of the San Rafael Hills, but more generally including most areas south of Foothill Blvd. The eastern part, even north of Foothill Blvd, was also originally considered Flintridge and is still home to the Flintridge Riding Club and Flintridge Preparatory School.

Incorporation 
On November 30, 1976, the cities of Flintridge and La Cañada were merged into a single incorporated city named "La Cañada Flintridge".

In a 2015 issue of Forbes, La Cañada Flintridge ranked as the 121st most expensive U.S. city.

Geography
The city is situated in the Crescenta Valley and far western end of the San Gabriel Valley, between the San Gabriel Mountains and Angeles National Forest to the north, and the San Rafael Hills to the south. Most of the city drains southeastward toward the Arroyo Seco area in Pasadena, but the western part of the city (generally west of Alta Canyada Road) drains southward toward Glendale via Verdugo Canyon. Both drainages join the Los Angeles River north of downtown Los Angeles. It is built of the Angeles Crest, the San Rafaels, and the canyon in the middle.

The city limits extend into the San Gabriel Mountains and reach  along Mount Lukens Road, which follows the crest line well above the developed city.

In August 2009, the city came under threat by the Station Fire. The city is considered a "very high fire hazard severity zone" because of the local topography at the base of the San Gabriel Mountains and abundance of California Live Oak, despite an aggressive fire safety program.

The city is home to Descanso Gardens and NASA's Jet Propulsion Laboratory.

Climate

The climate of La Cañada Flintridge is typical of a Southern California inland valley, with mild winters and hot summers. Spring often has hazy days, in contrast to the more persistently clear weather of fall. On average, the warmest month is August with high temperatures in the low to mid 90s and lows in the low 70s. December and January are the coolest months with typical highs in the low to mid 60s and lows in the low 40s. Rainfall occurs mostly during winter, averaging about 21 inches annually. Rainfall is rare in summer. The moderating influence of the ocean (22 miles, 35 km, away) is limited due to the city's location inland from the intervening Santa Monica Mountains, the Verdugo Mountains, and the San Rafael Hills. Consequently, summers are generally hotter and winters often cooler than in coastal parts of metropolitan Los Angeles if winds are calm or blowing gently offshore. Occasional strong offshore winds, known as the Santa Ana winds, can bring particularly hot air in summer and fall as air from the desert plateaus crosses the mountains and descends, thus warming further by adiabatic heating. Summer and early fall temperatures are substantially cooler if the prevailing wind is persistently onshore. Occasionally during a winter storm, the upper elevations of the city may see trace amounts of snow.

Demographics

2010
The 2010 United States Census reported that La Cañada Flintridge had a population of 20,246. The racial makeup of La Cañada Flintridge was 13,959 (68.9%) White (64.7% Non-Hispanic White), 
109 (0.5%) African American, 24 (0.1%) Native American, 5,214 (25.8%) Asian, 5 (0.0%) Pacific Islander, 245 (1.2%) from other races, and 690 (3.4%) from two or more races. There were 1,267 people of Hispanic or Latino origin, of any race (6.3%).

The Census reported that 20,219 people (99.9% of the population) lived in households, 21 (0.1%) lived in non-institutionalized group quarters, and 6 (0%) were institutionalized.

There were 6,849 households, out of which 2,873 (41.9%) had children under the age of 18 living in them, 5,029 (73.4%) were opposite-sex married couples living together, 525 (7.7%) had a female householder with no husband present, 214 (3.1%) had a male householder with no wife present. There were 103 (1.5%) unmarried opposite-sex partnerships, and 36 (0.5%) same-sex married couples or partnerships. 924 households (13.5%) were made up of individuals, and 559 (8.2%) had someone living alone who was 65 years of age or older. The average household size was 2.95. There were 5,768 families (84.2% of all households); the average family size was 3.24.

The age distribution of the population was spread out, with 5,315 people (26.3%) under the age of 18, 1,363 people (6.7%) aged 18 to 24, 3,157 people (15.6%) aged 25 to 44, 7,224 people (35.7%) aged 45 to 64, and 3,187 people (15.7%) who were 65 years of age or older. The median age was 45.9 years. For every 100 females there were 94.7 males. For every 100 females age 18 and over, there were 91.1 males.

The homeowner vacancy rate was 0.8%; the rental vacancy rate was 5.4%. 18,052 people (89.2% of the population) lived in owner-occupied housing units and 2,167 people (10.7%) lived in rental housing units.

According to the 2010 United States Census, La Cañada Flintridge had a median household income of $156,952, with 1.8% of the population living below the federal poverty line.

2000
As of the census of 2000, there were 20,318 people, 6,823 households, and 5,690 families residing in the city. The population density was 2,348.9 inhabitants per square mile (906.9/km2). The racial makeup of the city was 65.53% White, 0.36% Black or African American, 0.18% Native American, 31.57% Asian, 0.04% Pacific Islander, 1.01% from other races, and 3.31% from two or more races. 4.80% of the population was Hispanic or Latino of any race.

There were 6,823 households, out of which 44.1% had children under the age of 18 living with them, 73.7% were married couples living together, 7.3% had a female householder with no husband present, and 16.6% were non-families. 14.4% of all households were made up of individuals, and 8.0% had someone living alone who was 65 years of age or older. The average household size was 2.95 and the average family size was 3.27.

In the city, the population was spread out, with 29.8% under the age of 18, 5.1% from 18 to 24, 20.9% from 25 to 44, 30.2% from 45 to 64, and 14.0% who were 65 years of age or older. The median age was 42 years. For every 100 females there were 93.1 males. For every 100 females age 18 and over, there were 90.5 males.

According to a 2008 estimate, the median income for a household in the city was $140,474, and the median income for a family was $157,511. Males had a median income of $92,760 versus $57,321 for females. The per capita income for the city was $52,838. About 3.6% of families and 4.3% of the population were below the poverty line, including 4.8% of those under age 18 and 5.1% of those age 65 or over.

Arts and culture

Points of interest

 NASA's Jet Propulsion Laboratory (JPL) is located on the eastern end of La Cañada Flintridge (though its mailing address is in Pasadena). It is the primary United States research and development center for the robotic exploration of the Solar System.
 The first Frisbee golf course is located in the Hahamongna Watershed Park (formerly Oak Grove Park), outside of La Cañada Flintridge and across the street from La Cañada High School.
 Descanso Gardens hosts the largest collection of camellia species in North America.
 La Cañada Town Center opened on August 21, 2008. The $60 million shopping center development at the intersection of Foothill Boulevard and Angeles Crest Highway includes a remodeled Taylor's Steakhouse, a Panera Bread, a HomeGoods store, a Habit Burger Grill, a Blaze Pizza, and other retailers and eateries. The former Sports Chalet flagship store and corporate headquarters were the anchor tenants until their bankruptcy and subsequent closure in April 2016. The Sport Chalet store was replaced by a small-format Target store as a "test-in-concept", and the former corporate offices for Sports Chalet next door is now the new city hall, replacing the original built in 1975.
 La Cañada Congregational Church, formerly Church of the Lighted Window, is the city's oldest church.
 Lanterman House, museum and local historical archives is one of the early (1915) homes of the area.

Government

Municipal government
La Cañada Flintridge is governed by its city council, which has five members, each elected to overlapping four-year terms. Each year, the council selects one of its members to serve as mayor and another to serve as mayor pro-tem for terms of one year. The elections were held on March of odd-numbered years until 2017. Beginning in 2020, the elections are held during the California Primary elections. The council is aided by five commissions and two committees, each with its own area of responsibility. In addition, the council appoints the city manager, city attorney, city treasurer, and all members of its advisory bodies. It also serves as the governing board for the public improvement corporation, the redevelopment agency, the LCF Local Financing Authority, and Sanitation Districts No. 28 and No. 34.

As of July 2022, the current members of the city council are:
 Mayor Keith Eich
 Mayor Pro Tem Richard B. Gunter III
 Council Member Kim Bowman Jr.
 Council Member Teresa Walker 
 Council Member Michael T. Davitt

State and federal representation

In the California State Assembly, La Cañada Flintridge is located in the 43rd district, and is represented by Laura Friedman.

Education

Primary and secondary schools

Public schools
The La Cañada Unified School District (LCUSD) serves most of the city and is ranked as one of the top school districts in the state. On September 13, 2010, the California Department of Education announced that 2010 California Standards Tests (CSTs) results indicate that the La Cañada Unified School District earned the second highest Academic Performance Index (API) score in the state. The API reflects a district's performance level, based on the results of statewide testing. The district has three public elementary schools that serve grades K-6: La Cañada Elementary, Palm Crest Elementary, and Paradise Canyon Elementary School. The public high school, La Cañada High School, which also serves as a middle school (grades 7–8), is a 1993 and 2004 Blue Ribbon School.

A small western portion of the city is served by the Glendale Unified School District, with La Cañada Flintridge students attending Mountain Avenue Elementary School, Rosemont Middle School, Clark Magnet High School and Crescenta Valley High School.

Private schools
Several private schools that are not part of the LAUSD are located within La Cañada. The private high schools within the city limits are St. Francis High School, Flintridge Sacred Heart Academy, and Flintridge Preparatory School.

The private elementary schools within the city limits are Crestview Preparatory (K-6), The Learning Castle (K-3), La Canada Preparatory (grades 4–8), and St. Bede (K-8).

Delphi Academy of Los Angeles, a Delphi Academy school, opened in La Cañada Flintridge in 1984. The school left the city when its current campus in Lake View Terrace, Los Angeles opened in 2003.

Media
The city was originally serviced by two newspapers: The La Canada Valley Sun, a community division of the Los Angeles Times, and the La Canada Outlook. However, in April 2020, the Los Angeles Times announced it would be shutting down some of its local papers, including the La Canada Valley Sun due to continuing financial issues that were worsened by the COVID-19 pandemic. Shortly after, the La Canada Outlook announced they were buying the Valley Sun and were rebranding their newspaper as the La Canada Outlook Valley Sun.

Infrastructure

Emergency services
The Los Angeles County Sheriff's Department (LASD) provides law enforcement services to La Cañada Flintridge under contract and operates the Crescenta Valley Station in La Crescenta.

The Los Angeles County Fire Department (LACoFD) operates fire stations 19 and 82 in the city. Fire stations 11 and 12 in Altadena, and station 63 in La Crescenta-Montrose also serve the city regularly. Emergency transportation is done by Care Ambulance Service. Annual landscaping inspections and "stringent fire-safe building codes" were put in place to mitigate the risk of wildfires, like the 2009 Station Fire.

Transportation
La Cañada Flintridge is the southern terminus of the Angeles Crest Highway. It begins at the intersection with Foothill Boulevard and follows a two-mile, 5% grade before entering the San Gabriel Mountains.

On September 5, 2008, a big rig carrying 78,000 pounds of onions lost its brakes on the Angeles Crest Highway. To avoid a collision with the Hill Street Café at the intersection with Foothill Boulevard, the rig turned towards a small driveway, sideswiped the Café, crashed into a wall, a garbage bin, a tree and six vehicles before coming to rest in the parking lot. James Bines, 43, of Florida, and his passenger, Willy Robinson, had been hauling a full load of onions through the high desert area in the 18-wheeler. They traveled over the Angeles Crest Highway because, Bines said, he had received directions from his global positioning system that the highway, State Route 2, was the most direct route from there to Los Angeles.

On April 1, 2009, a similar incident occurred at roughly the same location. A car carrier transporting six cars southbound on the Angeles Crest Highway lost its brakes and, despite three runaway vehicle escape medians in the center islands, caused multiple vehicle accidents that resulted in two fatalities and 12 injuries, three of them critical. Angel Jorge Posca, 58, and his 12-year-old daughter Angelina, both of Palmdale, had just exited the eastbound Foothill Freeway at the Angeles Crest Highway in their red Ford Escort and were starting to turn north on the highway to return to Palmdale when the semi-truck struck their vehicle.

A bill that bans heavy trucks with three or more axles from driving on the Angeles Crest Highway was signed into law by Gov. Arnold Schwarzenegger on August 6, 2009.

Notable people
 Frances Arnold, Nobel prize winner in Chemistry, 2018 
 Angela Bassett, actress
 Carter Bays, television writer, producer, showrunner, novelist
 Chris Buck, animator, film director, screenwriter, voice actor
 Adam Carolla, comedian, radio personality, television host, actor, podcaster and director
 Kevin Costner, actor, producer, director, singer
 Miley Cyrus, actress, singer, and songwriter
Steve Dahl, radio personality, podcaster
Chris D'Elia, stand-up comedian, actor
 Rafael Furcal, MLB (Braves, Dodgers and Cardinals) baseball player
 Mark Geragos, criminal defense lawyer
 Donald Glover, actor, musician, writer
 Ollie Johnston, motion picture animator with Disney
 Jennifer Lee, screenwriter and film director with Disney
 David Lipsky, professional golfer
 Victor McLaglen, actor
 Alfred Molina, actor, director, producer, voice actor
Lizzie Molyneux-Logelin, American screenwriter and television producer, married to Matt Logelin
Collin Morikawa, professional golfer, PGA Championship winner (2020)
 Haley Joel Osment, actor
 Dennis Prager, conservative author, columnist, and radio talk show host
 Steve Priest, musician
 Frank Thomas, motion picture animator with Disney
 Michael Tucci, actor, longtime teacher at the city's St. Francis High School
 Matt Whisenant, professional baseball player and coach of La Cañada High School baseball team
 Vince Vaughn, actor, producer, screenwriter

See also

Sister cities 
  Villanueva de la Cañada, Spain

References

External links

 
 Chamber of Commerce

 
Cities in Los Angeles County, California
Communities in the San Gabriel Valley
Crescenta Valley
San Rafael Hills
Incorporated cities and towns in California
Populated places established in 1976
1976 establishments in California